James Gregory Henderson, also known as Big James Henderson and James "Hollywood" Henderson, (born April 9, 1965) is a former American powerlifter who specialized in the bench press. He competed in the International Powerlifting Federation (IPF) and was five times Super Heavyweight World Bench Press Champion.

Powerlifting career 
Henderson won five consecutive bench press world titles from the International Powerlifting Federation in the 1990s:
1994 Järvenpää, 
1995 Frydek-Mistek, 
1996 Silkeborg, 
1997 Leduc, 
1998 Amberg, 

Henderson became the second man to bench press over 700 lb raw in May 1996 when he pressed 705 lb in just a T-shirt and made it on the cover of Powerlifting USA magazine.

Personal records
Powerlifting competition record:

done in official powerlifting meets
 Bench press - 711.0 lb (322.5 kg) @ 390 lb (SHW) raw without wrist wraps and belt (July 13, 1997 USPF/IPF)
→ former IPF world record in SHW class (+regardless of weight class) for over 7 years; surpassed by Brian Siders's 712.1 lb (323.0 kg) (equipped in singleply bench shirt) in 2004

→ former all-time raw world record in SHW class (+regardless of weight class); surpassed by Scot Mendelson's 713 lbs (323.4 kg) (raw) in 2003

→ current all-time drug-tested raw world record in SHW class (+regardless of weight class) since 1997

Gym record (unofficial):

done in the gym according to James himself
 Bench press - 744 lb (337.5 kg) raw without wrist wraps and belt

Heaviest lift
James Henderson is the current world record holder for heaviest drug tested raw bench press in history and the highest raw bench press ever done in a full powerlifting 3-lift-meet (squat-bench press-deadlift). His record setting lift was 711.0 lbs. (322.5 kg) and was performed on July 13, 1997, in Philadelphia, Pennsylvania as the 3rd attempt at the USPF Senior Nationals (IPF/USPF sanctioned three-lift-event) under strict IPF-conditions. Henderson bench pressed unequipped in the strictest meaning of the word - without belt, without elbow bandages and even without wrist wraps - in just a T-shirt and a singlet. Although Shear'Ree was the first man to bench press , Henderson has his place in the record books as the second ever to press 700 pounds raw, without a bench press shirt.

Personal life
Henderson is a graduate of Mercer University, where he obtained a bachelor's degree in theology and psychology. He also attended Albany State University, where he played football from 1984 to 1986. His career as an offensive lineman ended when he blew out his knee.

In 1989 Henderson was convicted of drug trafficking and obstruction of justice, and was sentenced to 50 years in prison. He served 3 years at Rivers State Prison before being paroled and later pardoned in 1992. While at Rivers State he began reading the Bible and became a devoted born again Christian. Now Henderson gives motivational speeches to groups such as students, business leaders, and prisoners. He currently tours the Georgia Prison System as a speaker for Heartbound Ministries. During his appearances he tells his story of how he became the bench press champion and performs feats of strength.

See also
 Progression of the bench press world record
 Eric Spoto
 Scot Mendelson
 Jim Williams
 Ted Arcidi
 Brian Siders
 Shear'Ree

References

Living people
1965 births
American powerlifters
American motivational speakers
Albany State Golden Rams football players
Mercer University alumni